The Circus Ace is a 1927 American silent Western film directed by Benjamin Stoloff and written by Jack Jungmeyer. The film stars Tom Mix, Natalie Joyce, Jack Baston, Duke R. Lee, James Bradbury Sr., and Stanley Blystone. The film was released on June 26, 1927, by Fox Film Corporation.

Cast
 Tom Mix as Tom Terry
 Natalie Joyce as Millie Jane
 Jack Baston as Kirk Mallory
 Duke R. Lee as Job Jasper
 James Bradbury Sr. as Gus Peabody 
 Stanley Blystone as Boss Convas Man
 Dudley Smith as Durgan the Miller
 Buster Gardner as The Sheriff

See also
 Tom Mix filmography

References

External links 

 
 

1927 films
1927 Western (genre) films
American black-and-white films
1920s English-language films
Films directed by Benjamin Stoloff
Fox Film films
Silent American Western (genre) films
1920s American films